The Statue of Hercules in Behistun (or Statue of Heracles/Herakles in Bisotun, Persian: تندیس هرکول) is located on Mount Behistun, Iran.

The statue was sculpted in 148 BC, and dedicated in the name of "Herakles Kallinikos" (Ἡρακλῆν
Καλλίνικον, "Hercules glorious in victory") by a Seleucid governor. The Seleucid governor carved it in honor of a satrap.

Hercules is lying on a 2 m long platform and holds a bowl in his left hand. His right hand rests on his leg. The statue is 1.47 m long and is attached to the mountain. Heracles's club is carved in relief "as if propped up behind him" according to Matthew P. Canepa. The form of the stele bears similarities to Seleucid stelae that bore official inscriptions in the area, most notably the stele from Laodicia-in-Media (Nahavand), on which a local Seleucid official wrote down a copy of the dynastic cult inscription of Seleucid ruler Antiochus III the Great (r. 222–187 BC), which he had created for his wife Queen Laodice III.

The Bisotun Hercules was carved by a sculptor who was not formally trained in the Greek sculptural style. According to the modern historian Rolf Strootman, the design was more Iranian than Greek. In Hellenistic art, Heracles is seldom shown wielding a bow. In the rock relief, however, he is wielding a bow resembling those shown in the Behistun inscription. Although the epithet of the god ("kallinikos") was quite common in the Greek religion, it was also appropriate for the Iranian god Wahrām (Avestan Vərəθraγna-), with whom Hercules was assimilated. The statue of Hercules at Bisotun most likely attests to assimilation of the Greek god Hercules with the Iranian god Wahrām in the Seleucid period; however, it does not offer unequivocal evidence.

The relief may have been part of a naiskos (small shrine), as indicated by the nearby remnant of a small Ionic column, which is the same height (52 cm) as that of the Temple of Athena Nike in Athens.

An Aramaic version, drawn "quite a bit lighter" than the Greek version, was carved below. Canepa notes that this indicates that the sponsor of the inscription "intended to situate this message, both visually and linguistically, within the idiom of Seleucid imperial epigraphy". 

The head of the statue was stolen twice, but was recovered in 1996. The current head is a replica. The original head is held by the Cultural Heritage, Handcrafts and Tourism Organization.

References

Sources
 
 

2nd-century BC sculptures
Archaeological discoveries in Iran
Archaeological sites in Iran
Parthian art
Sculptures of Heracles
Seleucid Empire
Tourist attractions in Kermanshah Province
1958 in Iran
1958 archaeological discoveries
Aramaic inscriptions
Greek inscriptions